Movement Strategies Ltd is a company that specializes in people movement, crowd dynamics, and safety emergency procedures.
 
Movement Strategies helps its clients to plan and operate a space or place where there are large numbers of people, including stadiums, sports venues, transport facilities, public spaces, streets, and large buildings.

Its four key sectors are Sports, Events, Transport, Civic & Cultural, and Smart Cities.

Headquartered in London, Movement Strategies has worked with a range of high-profile clients including London 2012 Olympics, Tottenham Hotspur FC, The O2, Rugby World Cup, The All England Club, Glastonbury Festival, Telefonica, Network Rail, Transport for London, Historic Royal Palaces and UK Pavilion at Milan Expo 2015.

History
Movement Strategies Limited was formerly Evacuation Strategies Limited. Evacuation Strategies was founded in 2005 by Simon Ancliffe, its current Managing Director, after spinning it out from Crowd Dynamics Limited, where Simon was a Director.

The original focus of the business was on helping businesses, events, and cities plan for evacuation or invacuation (internal shelter) in the event of an emergency, based on the insights developed by Simon Ancliffe while developing the mass evacuation plans for the Canary Wharf business district after 9/11 and other clients.

However, the majority of its clients were derived from planning for major new infrastructure projects most notably design for all stations on the new Dubai Metro,  and for the Queen Elizabeth Olympic Park for the 2012 Games. This led to a change of emphasis and the company was rebranded Movement Strategies in 2008.

Since then its wide-ranging work on the London 2012 Olympics has helped it grow and expand, opening a Scandinavian office in 2011, led by Jørgen Aass, and operating worldwide on some of the most challenging crowd planning projects worldwide.

Simon Ancliffe
A scientist by training, Simon held previous marketing roles at Mars Confectionery (1990 – 1996) and was a Strategy Consultant at L.E.K. Consulting (1997-2000).

He is the co-author of “Guidance on designing for crowds – an integrated approach” for use where crowds are expected, in order to provide a safe environment.

Notable projects
 Chelsea Flower Show, London, UK 
 2009 FIFA Club World Cup, Abu Dhabi, UAE 
 Glastonbury Festival, Glastonbury, UK
 Great North Run, Newcastle, UK 
 John Lewis Partnership HQ, London, UK 
 London Aquatics Centre, London, UK 
 Ministry of Sound, London, UK 
 St Pancras International, London, UK 
 FIS Nordic World Ski Championships 2011, Oslo, Norway 
 Santiago Metro, Santiago, Chile 
 2014 Winter Olympics, Sochi, Russia 
 The O2, London, UK 
 Tottenham Hotspur F.C., London, UK 
 Tower of London, London, UK 
 Wembley Stadium, London, UK 
 Bank Monument Station, London, UK 
 Olympique Lyonnais FC, Lyon, France 
 Baku European Games, Baku, Azerbaijan 
 UK Pavilion, Milan Expo, Milan, Italy

References

Consulting firms established in 2005